The Dominican diaspora (Spanish: Diaspora dominicana) consists of Dominican people and their descendants living outside of the Dominican Republic. Countries with significant numbers of Dominicans include the United States and Spain. These two nations have had historical ties to the Dominican Republic and thus it is the primary destination for many migrants. Many Dominicans migrate to the United States via Puerto Rico in rafts.

There are roughly 2,500,000 million people of Dominican ancestry living outside the Dominican Republic, mainly due to economic issues, greater education, and political stability.

Dominicans mostly started to migrate to the US and Spain after the assassination of Rafael Trujillo, the authoritarian dictator who ruled from 1930 to 1961. He is notorious for his hatred of black people and Haitians and for orchestrating the Parsley Massacre, the mass killing of Haitians living in the northwestern frontier and in certain parts of the contiguous Cibao region in October 1937.

History 
The Dominican Republic originates from the Spanish colony of Santo Domingo. It was founded by Bartholomew Columbus, the brother of Christopher Columbus. The native peoples of Hispaniola, the Taino, an Arawak-speaking people, were completely wiped out due to diseases that the Spaniards brought from Europe. Nevertheless, today there are still some Dominicans with small amounts of Taino DNA, usually ranging from 5% to 10%.

Ethnic groups 

Dominicans are predominantly mixed with European (specifically Spanish), African, and some indigenous Taino ancestry.  Dominicans usually do not classify themselves as white or black like in the United States, but rather they identify with their nation, culture, and language.

The majority of Dominicans of predominantly European descent have ancestry from the Canary Islands and Andalucía, due to the heavy immigration of people from these areas of Spain to Latin America. Dominican Spanish is similar to the Spanish spoken in these regions.

Many Dominicans have at least partial African ancestry, which comes from the Atlantic slave trade. The majority of the slaves came from West Africa and the Congo. There are also many Dominicans of Haitian descent who immigrated from Haiti or have parents or grandparents who immigrated.

References 

American people of Dominican Republic descent
Demographics of the Dominican Republic